Umm Besher (also known as Barwa Village) is a district located in the municipality of Al Wakrah in Qatar, near the municipality's border with Doha.

It borders Al Thumama to the north, Ras Abu Fontas to the east, Al Mashaf to the south and Jery Musabbeh to the west. Barwa Village, a city-scale initiative by Barwa Group, is located here. Completed in 2010, Barwa Village comprises 18 mixed-use complexes with over 450 residential units and 900 commercial spaces. Contained within it are most modern amenities, including a health clinic, a shopping center, an international school, and parks.

Landmarks
CentrePoint Shopping Mall
Atlas Medical Clinic

Education
Shantiniketan Indian School
Pearl School at Umm Besher

References

Populated places in Al Wakrah